The California Golden Bears softball program is a college softball team that represents the University of California, Berkeley in the Pac-12 Conference in the National Collegiate Athletic Association. The team has had six head coaches since it started playing organized softball in the 1972 season.

Key

Coaches

Notes

References

Lists of college softball head coaches in the United States

California Golden Bears softball coaches